The Hahn Building is a historic site in Miami, Florida, United States. It is located at 140 Northeast 1st Avenue. On January 4, 1989, it was added to the U.S. National Register of Historic Places.

The building was built in 1921, and was designed by Gerald Joseph O'Reilly and George L. Pfeiffer.

References

External links

 
 
 
 Dade County listings at National Register of Historic Places
 Florida's Office of Cultural and Historical Programs
 Dade County listings
 Hahn Building

Buildings and structures in Miami
National Register of Historic Places in Miami